Séféto Nord is a rural commune in the Cercle of Kita in the Kayes Region of south-western Mali. The commune includes 6 villages and in the 2009 census had a population of 9,671. The principal village is Niagané.

References

External links
.
 Le site du village de Niagane 

Communes of Kayes Region